The Falconer is a bronze sculpture by James Lee Hansen. Dates for the abstract piece range from the 1960s to 1973.

Description
The bronze sculpture, which depicts abstract tools of the falconer trade, measures approximately  x  x  and weighs between 200 and 300 lbs.

History
The Falconer was installed by Prince Lucien Campbell Hall on the University of Oregon campus in Eugene, Oregon, after being donated by Jordan Schnitzer in 1974. The sculpture was surveyed and deemed "treatment needed" by the Smithsonian Institution's "Save Outdoor Sculpture!" program in 1994. It was stolen in November 2008. The university offered a $2,000 reward for information leading to the work's return.

See also

 Campus of the University of Oregon
 Talos No. 2 (1959–1977) and Winter Rider No. 2 (2003), sculptures by Hansen in Portland, Oregon

References

External link
The Falconer

1960s sculptures
1970s sculptures
Abstract sculptures in Oregon
Bronze sculptures in Oregon
Outdoor sculptures in Eugene, Oregon
Sculptures by James Lee Hansen
Stolen works of art
University of Oregon campus